Vero Nika is a Burmese Lethwei and Muay Thai fighter from Myanmar. She is one of the most successful female Lethwei fighters in the sport. In 2022, amid unrest in Myanmar because of the 2021 Myanmar coup d'état, she started competing in Muaythai in neighboring Thailand and reached the no.1 spot in the female world rankings at 53 kg according to World Muay Thai Organization.

Early life 
Vero Nika was born in a small village named Kahpu, north of Moe Bye. She is a Christian and an ethnic Kayan, and was named after Saint Veronica. After her fights she can sometimes be seen carrying the flag of the Karenni and/or Kayan people. When she was young she had to help her mother sell the alcohol she made herself. Her father was sick so she would get up early before school and deliver around town while missing some time at school. Vero Nika is the fifth child out of six, and they relied on the Roman Catholic monastery in Pekon for their education.

Boxing career 
By the time she was in 9th standard at the age of 16, she was determined to become a boxer. Her parents did not approve of her new hobby but she was committed to succeed. With some borrowed money she left for Naypyidaw to start her training. Since she mainly spoke in the Padaung language she had trouble understanding those who spoke Burmese. While in training that gradually improved. She continued to attend school but was forced to choose between education or sports a year later. Her boxing career lasted from 2013 to 2017 in which she participated in the 2015 SEA Games in Singapore, and partook in several national championships claiming at least two gold medals in the process.

Lethwei career 
In 2017, Vero Nika started her Lethwei career because there weren't enough fights in boxing. After being scouted by International Lethwei Federation Japan (ILFJ) promoter Yoshiyuki Nakamura in May, she participated in their Frontier event. She faced pro-wrestler Nanae Takahashi in a three round contest for the ILFJ Frontier Championship belt. 

On 15 November 2017, Vero Nika faced Julija Stoliarenko in Lethwei Grand Prix Japan 2017 in Tokyo. Stoliarenko's low-kicks caused a fracture in Vero Nika's tibia and she had to retire from the fight. Stoliarenko won the Japan Lethwei World Title by TKO.

In October 2018, a mix-fight card was held in Thailand with both Lethwei and Muay Thai bouts featured. The Lethwei portion of the show was also narrated in Burmese by the ringside announcer. Vero Nika faced Hongthong Liangprasert in the first of three encounters in her career. Due to a cut in round two, the fight was stopped and Vero Nika won by TKO.

At the Air KBZ sponsored championship in 2018, Vero Nika once more fought Hongthong Liangprasert, this time for a chance to win the accompanying belt especially created for that match. The fight ended up a draw however, so the belt was up for grabs again in January where she fought Wanida Yucharoen. This time around she won the fight and is officially crowned the Myanmar champion.

In August 2019 she faced multiple-time Muay Thai champion Sawsing Sor Sopit at the 4th Myanmar Lethwei World Championship event. This was a clear step up in competition and the fight was much anticipated. Despite her many elbows and kicks it ended in a draw after 4 rounds.

By 2020, Vero Nika was one of the most frequently seen fighters out of the smaller women's talent pool. She had been booked in 8 fights in 2019 of which 6 materialized, leaving behind her competition with ease. Since then nearly 90% of the competitors she shared the ring with have retired or moved on to other sports. Vero Nika has previously expressed that it is difficult to get fights because there are very few native female fighters.

Muay Thai career 
While fighting she has been able to support her family to a certain extent, but the low income had kept her from committing to her career. At the start of the COVID-19 pandemic when fights were scarce, aside from helping her family in the farming business, Vero Nika temporarily took on the role of trainer at Phoenix Myanmar Lethwei Gym in Yangon. Vero Nika's venture into Thailand started when a client who visited the gym suggested that it would be easier to get fights abroad and helped her get into contact with Tiger Muay Thai. After two encounters with Dangkongfah at Muay Hardcore, she was invited to Thai Fight. By the time she had her third fight, they had signed her to a 3-year contract. As of April she earns just over 2 million ($1000) per fight not including travel and food expenses.

While fighting in Thailand she did not expect to have any support because of the situation back home and so many people having a hard time to survive. She felt she had fled and was having a good time while her countrymen weren't. She revealed that her victories were the good news they needed back home and support from fans and media has been constant ever since.

On 17 April 2022, Vero Nika defeated her opponent Thailand's Yimsiam in just 30 seconds of the first round. She was then promoted to the no.1 spot in the female world rankings at 118lbs/53KG according to World Muay Thai Organization.

Personal life 
Vero Nika loves to sing and is also known by her nickname "Fighting Idol". In 2018, she appeared on the third season of Myanmar Idol. She survived until the Green Mile, where she was eliminated. Sometimes she has a hard time when thinking of her family back home and the struggles they face. She confides in singing and listening to her favorite songs from home.

Titles and accomplishments 
Championships and Awards'
 Lethwei
 Air KBZ Grand Final Myanmar Championship (60kg)
 2019 Female Fighter of the Year

 Muaythai
 Thai Fight Kard Chuek 2022 tournament champion (53kg)
 World Muaythai Organization (WMO) No. 1 Ranked Women Bantamweight (53kg)
 World Boxing Council (WBC) Muay Thai No. 1 Contender Women Bantamweight (53kg)
 2022 WMO Female Fighter of the Year
 2015 Southeast Asian Games (57kg) – Tampines, Singapore – Bronze medal

 Boxing
  2016 Myanmar National Boxing Championship (60kg)
  2015 4th Myanmar National Sports Festival (60kg)

Lethwei record 

|- style="background:#cfc;"
| 2020-01-15 || Win || align="left" | Petchsaifah Sor.Sommai || (68th) Kayah State Day || Loikaw, Myanmar || KO || 1 ||
|- style="background:#cfc;"
| 2020-01-04 || Win || align="left" | Plaifah Mhooping Aroijungbei || Mandalay Rumbling Challenge Fight || Taungoo, Myanmar || KO || 2 ||
|- style="background:#c5d2ea;"
| 2019-11-03 || Draw || align="left" | Miriam Sabot || (6th) Air KBZ Aung Lan Championship || Yangon, Myanmar || Draw || 4 || 3:00
|- style="background:#c5d2ea;"
| 2019-08-18 || Draw || align="left" | Sawsing Sor Sopit || Myanmar Lethwei World Championship 4 || Yangon, Myanmar || Draw || 4 || 3:00
|- style="background:#cfc;"
| 2019-04-20 || Win || align="left" | Prakayrat Wongsuta || Zin Kyaik Buddha Pujaniya Festival || Zin Kyaik, Myanmar || KO || 2 ||
|- style="background:#c5d2ea;"
| 2019-03-20 || Draw || align="left" | Hongthong Liangprasert || Mon-Myanmar-Thai Challenge Fights || Lamaing, Ye, Myanmar || Draw || 4 || 3:00
|- style="background:#cfc;"
| 2019-01-09 || Win || align="left" | Phettae Kulabdamgym || (27th) Karen New Year Celebration || Hpa-an, Myanmar || KO || 2 ||
|- style="background:#cfc;"
| 2019-01-04 || Win || align="left" | Wanida Yucharoen || Independence Day Challenge Fights || Taungoo, Myanmar || TKO || 1 ||
|-
! style=background:white colspan=9 |
|- style="background:#c5d2ea;"
| 2018-12-16 || Draw || align="left" | Hongthong Liangprasert || Air KBZ Grand Final Myanmar Championship || Yangon, Myanmar || Draw || 4 || 3:00
|-
! style=background:white colspan=9 |
|- style="background:#cfc;"
| 2018-10-28 || Win || align="left" | Hongthong Liangprasert || Diamond Super Fight || Samut Sakhon province, Thailand || TKO || 2 ||
|- style="background:#c5d2ea;"
| 2018-09-13 || Draw || align="left" | Marina Kumagai || Lethwei in Japan 9: Kodo || Tokyo, Japan || Draw || 5 || 3:00
|- style="background:#c5d2ea;"
| 2018-08-19 || Draw || align="left" | Elena Mishchuk || Myanmar Lethwei World Championship 3 || Yangon, Myanmar || Draw || 4 || 3:00
|- style="background:#cfc;"
| 2018-03-25 || Win || align="left" | Jompaneng Sitpusoy Kom Ning || Lethwei in Thailand || Samut Sakhon province, Thailand || KO || 2 ||
|- style="background:#cfc;"
| 2018-03-01 || Win || align="left" | Prakayrat Wongsuta || Kyaik Kelasa Stadium || Lamaing, Ye, Myanmar || TKO || 3 ||
|- style="background:#cfc;"
| 2018-01-04 || Win || align="left" | Mway Pway Ma || Mandalay Rumbling Challenge Fight || Taungoo, Myanmar || KO || 3 ||
|- style="background:#fbb;"
| 2017-11-15 || Loss || align="left" | Julija Stoliarenko ||Lethwei Grand Prix Japan 2017 || Tokyo, Japan || TKO || 2 || 0:45
|-
! style=background:white colspan=9 |
|- style="background:#c5d2ea;"
| 2017-08-20 || Draw || align="left" | Mónica Brenes || Myanmar Lethwei World Championship 2 || Yangon, Myanmar || Draw || 4 || 3:00
|- style="background:#c5d2ea;"
| 2017-06-16 || Draw || align="left" | Nanae Takahashi || Lethwei in Japan 4: Frontier|| Tokyo, Japan || Draw || 3 || 3:00
|-
! style=background:white colspan=9 |
|-
| colspan=9 | Legend:

Muay Thai record

|- style="background:#cfc;"
| 2023-02-05 || Win || align="left" | Yuly Alves || Thai Fight: Luang Phor Ruay || Saraburi, Thailand || Decision || 3 || 3:00
|- style="background:#cfc;"
| 2022-12-24|| Win || align="left" | Fani Peloumpi|| Thai Fight: Metropolitan Police Bureau 100th Anniversary || Bangkok, Thailand || KO (Right cross)|| 3 || 
|-
! style=background:white colspan=9 |
|- style="background:#cfc;"
| 2022-11-20|| Win || align="left" | Daniela Lopez|| Thai Fight: Vana Nava Hua Hin || Hua Hin district, Thailand || Decision || 3 ||3:00 
|- style="background:#cfc;"
| 2022-10-16 || Win ||align=left| Mariana Bernardes || Thai Fight: Vajiravudh || Bangkok, Thailand || KO (Left hook to the body)|| 2 ||
|- style="background:#cfc;"
| 2022-06-26 || Win ||align=left| Plaifah Sor.Nittaya || Thai Fight: Sisaket || Sisaket, Thailand || KO || 2 ||
|- style="background:#cfc;"
| 2022-05-29 || Win ||align=left| Angela Chang || Thai Fight: Nakhon Sawan || Nakhon Sawan, Thailand || Decision (Unanimous) || 3 || 3:00
|- style="background:#cfc;"
| 2022-05-08 || Win ||align=left| Sanaz Feizollah || Thai Fight: Sung Noem || Sung Noen, Thailand || KO || 1 ||
|- style="background:#cfc;"
| 2022-04-17 || Win ||align=left| Yimsiam Komin-Furniture || Thai Fight: Pathum Thani || Pathum Thani, Thailand || KO || 1 ||
|- style="background:#cfc;"
| 2022-03-20 || Win ||align=left| Petchsarocha Looksaikongdin || Thai Fight: Lampang || Lampang, Thailand || Decision (Unanimous) || 3 || 3:00
|- style="background:#cfc;"
| 2022-02-26 || Win ||align=left| Dangkongfah Smartheartpowerpackgirl || Muay Hardcore || Thailand || Decision (Unanimous) || 3 || 3:00
|- style="background:#fbb;"
| 2022-01-08 || Loss ||align=left| Dangkongfah Smartheartpowerpackgirl || Muay Hardcore || Thailand || Decision (Split) || 3 || 3:00
|-
| colspan=9 | Legend:

Amateur boxing record

References

1996 births
Living people
Burmese Lethwei practitioners
Burmese female Muay Thai practitioners 
Veronika